97 Aces Go Places is a 1997 Hong Kong action comedy film directed by Chin Kar-lok and starring Alan Tam, Tony Leung, Christy Chung, Donna Chu and Francis Ng. The film is the sixth and final installment of the Aces Go Places film series and features a different cast and storyline.

Plot
Con artist Mandy Ling / Li Lai Shan cons a rich triad leader Lui Yu Yeung out of his money and gives it to a convalescent center where her mentally disturbed sister Mandy Li is staying. Earlier, she had also conned another triad leader out of a large sum of money in a poker game causing him to die from a heart attack. The triad leader states in his will that his son Ho Sik must avenge him by killing her with a gun. Ho Sik, who has no interest in guns and violence, hires Chui Cheong, the "Drunken Gun", an ace gunman to tutor him. However, Ho later finds himself falling in love with Mandy and is reluctant to kill her.

Cast
Alan Tam as Ho Sik / Ho Sik's father
Tony Leung Chiu-Wai as Chu Cheong, the Drunken Gun
Christy Chung as Mandy Ling / Li Lai Shan
Donna Chu as Mandy Li
Francis Ng as Lui Yu Yeung
Simon Lui as Chung Yue
Maria Cordero as God Mother
Ben Lam as Lung
Moses Chan as Yeung's sidekick
Billy Chow as Yeung's killer
Raymond Wong as Senior Police Officer
Dayo Wong as Mr. Chan
Bennett Pang as Pastor
Emily Kwan as Yue's driving instructor
Lam Chiu Wing as musician
Chin Siu-ho as driver admiring Sik's car
Karen Tong as woman in the street
Joey Leung as retarded man
Vincent Kok as Fatty Fook
Collin Chou as police special force
Timmy Hung as police special force
Mok Ka Yiu as police special force
Carlo Ng as police special force
See Mei Yee as Yeung's art appraiser
Johnny Wong as musician
Mang Hoi as lieutenant of Sik's Group
Ka Lee as lieutenant of Sik's Group
Lee Chi Kit as lieutenant of Sik's Group
Ma Koo as tea lady at poker game
Kuk Hin Chiu
Dion Lam as Fatty's man in black
Chin Kar-lok as Fatty's man in black
Peter Chan as lieutenant of Sik's Group
Yee Tin Hung as Fatty's man in black
Tang Chiu Yau as Fatty's man in black
Rocky Lai as Yeung's killer
Chan Siu Lung
Nelson Cheung as man in the street
Chu Cho Kuen as Yeung's thug
Jack Wong as Yeung's thug
Mak Wai Cheung as Yeung's thug
Cheung Bing Chuen as Fatty's man in black

Box office
The film grossed HK$10,745,180 at the Hong Kong box office during its theatrical run 21 June to 9 July 1997 in Hong Kong.

References

External links

97 Aces Go Places at Hong Kong Cinemagic

97 Aces Go Places Review at LoveHKFilm.com

1997 films
1997 action comedy films
Hong Kong action comedy films
1990s Cantonese-language films
Films set in Hong Kong
Films shot in Hong Kong
Hong Kong detective films
1990s Hong Kong films